Hadel Aboud (born 21 October 1999) is a Libyan athlete. She competed in the women's 100 metres event at the 2020 Summer Olympics.

References

External links
 

1999 births
Living people
Libyan female sprinters
Athletes (track and field) at the 2020 Summer Olympics
Olympic athletes of Libya
Place of birth missing (living people)
African Games competitors for Libya
Athletes (track and field) at the 2019 African Games
Olympic female sprinters